Sharmila Mukerjee is an Odissi Dancer and Choreographer, a disciple of Guru Kelucharan Mohapatra. She is the founder and artistic director of Sanjali Centre for Odissi Dance, Bangalore which was established in 2004. She is the recipient of the Mahari Award.

Early life and education 
At the age of 16, Sharmila Mukerjee played the lead role of 'Prakriti' in Rabindranath Tagore's dance drama 'Chandalika' during the poet's birth anniversary, which caught the attention of critics for her grace. She started her Odissi training under Guru Kelucharan Mohapatra in 1984. Eventually, she took guidance in Abhinaya from Smt.Kalanidhi Narayanan and attended workshops conducted by Smt.Sanjukta Panigrahi.

Career 
In the year 2000, Sharmila Mukerjee won a scholarship at University of Michigan where she trained in dance movement and composition

Sharmila Mukerjee is an A Grade artist of Doordarshan and an established artist of Indian Council for Cultural Relations. She has performed in various festivals in India and abroad like Fiji, Malaysia, Australia, New Zealand, Italy, United States, Indonesia, UAE.

Sharmila founded Sanjali Centre for Odissi Dance in 2004. The Sanjali Ensemble has been empanelled by Ministry of Culture (India) in the 'Outstanding' category to participate in festivals in India and abroad. She has been hosting an annual Odissi show in Bangalore which is titled 'Pravaha'. Its recent edition staged 'Sookshma'- a touching Odissi dance ballet from the popular Kannada folktale "a Flowering tree" by eminent writer A. K. Ramanujan.

Awards 
 Singar Mani from Sur Singar Samsad (Mumbai)
 The Kala Gaurav from Karnataka
 The Sironama from Kolkata
 Mahari Award from Guru Pankaj Charan Das Foundation

References

Year of birth missing (living people)
Living people
Indian women choreographers
Odissi exponents
University of Michigan School of Music, Theatre & Dance alumni